Bernd Ladwig (born 7 August 1966) is a German political philosopher who is a Professor of Political Theory and Political Philosophy at the Free University of Berlin.

He studied political science at the Free University of Berlin from 1988 to 1994, and then read for a doctorate in philosophy at Berlin's Humboldt University, graduating in 1999. He took up a research post at Otto von Guericke University Magdeburg from 2000 to 2004, before becoming a juniorprofessor in modern political theory at the Free University of Berlin. In 2011, he became a Univ.-Prof..

Select bibliography
Ladwig, Bernd (2011). Gerechtigkeitstheorien zur Einführung. Hamburg: Junius Verlag.
Ladwig, Bernd (2009). Moderne politische Theorie. Fünfzehn Vorlesungen zur Einführung Schwalbach/Taunus: Wochenschau Verlag.
Ladwig, Bernd (2000). Gerechtigkeit und Verantwortung. Liberale Gleichheit für autonome Personen. Berlin: Akademie Verlag.

References

1966 births
Living people
German philosophers
German political philosophers
Writers from Cologne
Academic staff of the Free University of Berlin
Free University of Berlin alumni
Humboldt University of Berlin alumni